Lewiston Public Schools (LPS) is a school district headquartered in Lewiston, Maine, USA.

Demographics
As of 2014 the district has over 5,000 students. The most common non-English language spoken by students is Somali, with speakers making up 90% of the district's students who don't have English as a native language. The remainder speak about 23 other languages. Out of the total student body the percentage which qualifies for free or reduced lunches is 69%.

Schools
 Lewiston High School
 Lewiston Middle School
 As of 2015 there are 775 students, 20% of them being Somali Americans.
Elementary schools:
Farwell Elementary School
Raymond A. Geiger Elementary School
Robert V. Connors Elementary School
Thomas J. McMahon Elementary School
Montello Elementary School

Others:
Lewiston Regional Technical Center
Lewiston Adult Education

Leadership
The Lewiston School Committee is the governing body of Lewiston Public Schools. Its members are:
Bruce Damon (Ward 1)
Janet Beaudoin (Ward 2)
Elizabeth Eames (Ward 3)
Tanya Whitlow (Ward 4)
Ashley Medina (Ward 5)
Meghan Hird (Ward 6)
Paul Beauparlant (Ward 7)
Megan Parks (At Large) (Chairwoman 2020-2022) (Vice-Chair 2022-current) (https://www.linkedin.com/in/megandparks/)
Linda Scott (City Council Representative)

The School Committee hires and oversees the superintendent. Since 2020, the superintendent of Lewiston Public Schools has been Jake Langlais.

References

External links
 
School districts in Maine
Lewiston, Maine
Education in Androscoggin County, Maine